is a Japanese race queen and gravure idol who is represented by the talent agency, Platinum Production.

Filmography

TV series

Dramas

Films

Radio series

Internet series

Stage plays

Direct-to-video

Games

References

External links
 

Japanese gravure models
Japanese female models
Japanese television personalities
1985 births
Living people
Models from Kanagawa Prefecture